Christophe Anly (born 15 November 1975) is a retired Malagasy football midfielder.

References

1975 births
Living people
Malagasy footballers
Madagascar international footballers
AS Fortior players
Léopards de Transfoot players
Association football midfielders